Halophila is a genus of seagrasses in the family Hydrocharitaceae, the tape-grasses. It was described as a genus in 1806. The number of its contained species, and its own placement in the order Alismatales, has evolved.

Description 
These oceanic herbs grow underwater and have creeping stoloniferous stems and leafy nodes. Unlike other seagrasses, the leaves of some species of Halophila do not have basal sheaths (i.e. the bases of the leaves do not wrap around the stem to form a sheath).

The flowers are unisexual. The male flowers are borne on stems. The parts occur in multiples of three along a single row.

The female flowers do not have stalks. They are divided into three segments. The single chambered ovary has a long beak. The three style are long and simple. The ovules are attached on top of three placentas.

The fruit is included in the bract surrounding the inflorescence (the spathe) and crowned by a beak. They have many seeds and thick embryos.

Distribution 
This genus is widespread in tropical waters, the distribution range also extends to subtropical and temperate waters primarily the Indian and Pacific Oceans but also the Mediterranean and Caribbean Seas and the Gulf of Mexico. It is found growing off the coasts of Africa, India, Australia and the Pacific Islands.

Naming 
The Latin specific epithet halophila refers to salt loving.

Species
Species accepted by the Kew Botanical Garden.

  - southern Australia
   Halophila baillonii - Caribbean, North and South America
 Halophila beccarii - South + East + Southeast Asia
 Halophila capricorni - New Caledonia, islands in Coral Sea
 Halophila decipiens - shores of Indian Ocean and Pacific Ocean; Caribbean, Gulf of Mexico
 Halophila engelmannii - Mexico, Costa Rica, Bahamas, Caymans, Cuba, United States (PR, FL, LA, TX)
 Halophila gaudichaudii - Indian Ocean, western Pacific
 Halophila hawaiiana - Hawaii
 Halophila major - Japan, Taiwan, Southeast Asia, Caroline Is, Sri Lanka
 Halophila mikii - Japan
 Halophila minor - Indian Ocean, western Pacific
 Halophila nipponica (syn. Halophila japonica)- Korea, Japan
 Halophila okinawensis - Nansei-shoto
 Halophila ovalis - Red Sea, Indian Ocean, western Pacific
 Halophila spinulosa - Southeast Asia, North Australia, New Guinea
 Halophila stipulacea - Red Sea, Indian Ocean, invasive in the Caribbean
 Halophila sulawesii - Sulawesi
 Halophila tricostata - Queensland

Removal of Halophila johnsonii (Johnson's seagrass) from U.S. Federal List of Threatened and Endangered Species

In 2022 the National Marine Fisheries Service (NMFS) and National Oceanic and Atmospheric Administration (NOAA) ruled to remove Halophila johnsonii (Johnson's seagrass) from the Federal Endangered Species Act (ESA). This ruling was based on recent genetic data obtained that show that Johnson's seagrass is not a genetically unique taxon. Johnson's seagrass is genetically similar to the Indo-Pacific species, H. ovalis, based on findings from multiple publishing's. As Johnson's seagrass is not genetically diverse, it no longer meets the requirements set by the ESA to be considered a species. The ESA defines a species as "any subspecies of fish or wildlife or plants, and any distinct population segment of any species of vertebrate fish or wildlife which interbreeds when mature 16 U.S.C. 1532". All gene samples of Johnson's seagrass from Indian River Lagoon over a 17 year study were genetically uniform. In the same study it was determined that due to the lack of genetic diversity, Johnson's seagrass was a clone of H. ovalis, closely related to populations in Africa and Antigua. The clone may be derived from a recent introduction from one of those regions (Waycott et al., 2021).

References

External links

 
Western Australia Seagrass web page for Halophila 

 
Hydrocharitaceae genera